El Gusto is a Franco-Irish-Algerian documentary film realised and produced by Safinez Bousbia, released on January 11, 2012 in France.

Synopsis

El Gusto chronicles the story of an orchestra of Jewish and Muslim Chaabi musicians torn apart by war for 50 years, and reunited for an exceptional concert.

Music 

A studio album, Abdel Hadi Halo & The El Gusto Orchestra of Algiers, was produced by Damon Albarn in Algeria for his own Honest Jon's label. It was distributed by EMI in 2007.

Cast 

 Mamad Haïder Benchaouchi : in his own role.
 Abdel Hadi Halo : in his own role.
 Reda Djilali : in his own role.
 Rachid Berkani : in his own role.
 Ahmed Bernaoui : in his own role.
 Robert Castel : in his own role.
 Luc Cherki : in his own role.
 Mustapha Tahmi : in his own role.
 Mohamed el-Ferkioui : in his own role.

Concerts 

 2014:  
 27/11: Opéra de Monte Carlo, Monaco (France) 
 23/10: Womex, Santiago de Compostella (Spain)
 2013: 
 27/11: La Halle aux grains, Toulouse (France)
 19/10: La Coursive, La Rochelle (France)
 17/10: Festival des Libertés, Bruxelles (Belgium)
 11/08: Green Music Center, Sonoma (United States)
 10/08: Grand Performance, Los Angeles (United States)
 06/08: Kennedy Center, Washington D.C (United States)
 03/08: Lincoln Center, New York (United States)
 15/06: Festival des Chants Sacrés, Fes (Morocco)
 15/06: UNESCO, Paris (France)
 03/06: The Barbican, Londres (UK)
 02/06: The Carré Theater, Amsterdam (Netherlands) 
 31/05: Mawazine, Rabat (Morocco)
 2012:
 30/10: World Music Festival, Oslo (Norway) 
 27/10: Le Colisée, Roubaix (France) 
 24&25/10: MC2, Grenoble (France) 
 21/10: La Paloma, Nîmes (France) 
 20/10: Les Docks du Sud, Marseille (France) 
 18/10: Le Mals, Sochaux (France) 
 30/09: Musée du Judaïsme, Paris (France) 
 09/08: Les Nuits du Sud, Vence (France) 
 07/08: Théâtre de la Mer, Sète (France) 
 05/08: Festival du Bout du Monde, Crozon (France) 
 04/08: Festival Esperanzah, Namur (Belgium) 
 13/07: Les Suds à Arles, Arles (France) 
 11/07: Scènes d'été, Geneva (Switzerland) 
 06/07: Les Hauts de Garonne, Bordeaux (France) 
 12/01: Palais des Beaux-Arts, Brussels (Belgium) 
 9&10/01: Le Grand Rex, Paris (France) 
 2007-2010: 
 Palais des Beaux-Arts, Bruxelles (Belgium) 
 L'Alhambra, Paris (France) 
 Andalousies Atlantiques, Essaouira (Morocco) 
 Les Nuits de Fourvière, Lyon (France) 
 The Opening of the Jazz Fest, Berlin (Germany) 
 The Barbican, London (UK) 
 Théâtre du Gymnase, Marseille (France) 
 Palais Omnisports de Bercy, Paris (France)

Awards 

In 2011, El Gusto won two awards at the Abu Dhabi Film Festival, including the "FRIPESCI prize" and Best Director from the Arab World for Safinez Bousbia.

References

External links

2011 documentary films
2011 films
Documentary films about African music
Algerian music